Abiola Olawunmi Odumosu (born 31 October 1973) is a Nigerian table tennis player. She competed in the women's singles event at the 1992 Summer Olympics.

References

External links
 

1973 births
Living people
Nigerian female table tennis players
Olympic table tennis players of Nigeria
Table tennis players at the 1992 Summer Olympics
Place of birth missing (living people)